John Gage (by 1537 – 1598) was an English politician.

He was a Member (MP) of the Parliament of England for Lewes in 1558.

References

1598 deaths
People from Carlisle, Cumbria
English MPs 1558
Year of birth uncertain